Posesif is a 2017 Indonesian psychological drama film directed by Edwin and written by Gina S. Noer, starring Putri Marino and Adipati Dolken. The film was released on 26 October 2017.

The film focuses on a couple of high school students in a turbulent relationship. The film was well received by critics and audiences alike and garnered 10 nominations at the 37th Citra Awards, including Best Picture. It won three: Best Director (Edwin), Best Actress (Putri Marino), and Best Supporting Actor (Yayu Unru).

Synopsis 
Lala Anindhita (Putri Marino) is a platform diving athlete in her final year of high school in Jakarta. Since her mother passed away, she feels her world is complete with her father (who is also her trainer), and her two friends, Rino (Chicco Kurniawan) and Ega (Gritte Agatha). Even though her father is quite strict, Lala remains good-spirited.

At school, while helping her teacher, Lala meets Yudhis Ibrahim (Adipati Dolken), a transfer student who immediately gets into trouble with a teacher. The two students are disciplined and they are made to walk the around the school oval with their shoelaces tied to each other's. They are humiliated in front of the whole school, but they bond through the experience and later start dating.

Lala's father, while nonchalant about her dating, begins to notice that her athletic and academic discipline is wavering. At the same time, Yudhis begins to show possessive behaviour and wants Lala to be by his side at all times.

Cast 

 Putri Marino as Lala, a high school athlete
 Adipati Dolken as Yudhis, a transfer student
 Gritte Agatha as Ega
 Chicco Kurniawan as Rino
 Cut Mini as Yudhis' mother
 Yayu Unru as Lala's father
 Ismail Basbeth as sports teacher
 Maulidina Putri as Jihan
 Pranarta as Lala's coach

Themes 
Posesif explores themes of violence within relationships.

Screenwriter Gina S. Noer conducted six months of research on the topic for the film's production, finding that violence typically manifests in the first phases of dating relationships, and most frequently affects women aged 13 to 24 years.

Release 
The film received theatrical release in Indonesia on 26 October 2017, and is classified by Lembaga Sensor Film as suitable for ages 13 and above.

Reception

Box office 
Posesif performed moderately at the box office with a reported 170,000 admissions during its run, making it Edwin's most commercially successful release to date.

Critical response 
Posesif received mixed reviews. Puput Juniman of CNN Indonesia praised the film for avoiding tropes and cliché storylines as well as for Edwin's direction, the cast performances, and Batara Goempar's cinematography. Aulia Adam of Tirto.id highlighted the film's portrayal of a toxic relationship and how it plays in a patriarchal society, but felt that the film left some important questions unanswered.

Awards and nominations

References

External links
 
 

Indonesian drama films
2017 films
2017 drama films
Films about stalking